"Yo No Sé Que Me Pasó" ("I Do Not Know What Happened To Me") is a song written, produced and performed by Mexican singer-songwriter Juan Gabriel. It was released in 1986 as the first single from his studio album Pensamientos. This song deals with the end of a love relationship, falling out of love. It peaked at number-one in the Billboard Hot Latin Tracks chart on September 13, 1986, being the second song to do so, replacing "La Guirnalda", another song written by Gabriel; however, in the printed version of the same chart, the song is recognized as the first song ever to top the chart. "Yo No Sé Qué Me Pasó" has been covered by Rocío Dúrcal, Pedro Fernández and Julio Preciado.

Chart performance

See also
 List of number-one Billboard Top Latin Songs from the 1980s

References 

1986 singles
Juan Gabriel songs
Songs written by Juan Gabriel
Spanish-language songs
1986 songs
RCA Records singles